The Irish Benevolent Society of London, Ontario is a philanthropic organization founded on March 1, 1877. Its purposes are to provide opportunities for Canadians of Irish descent and their friends to engage in benevolent activities and to preserve their Irish heritage.

The Society was unique at the time of its foundation in accepting both Roman Catholic and Protestant members. In much of Ontario sectarianism ruled, and continued to rule until well into the twentieth century, with the Orange Order pitted against Roman Catholic and other organizations. In fact, the constitution of the Society provides that presidents (who are elected for one year) must be alternately Roman Catholic and Protestant. The discussion of Irish politics has also been forbidden at meetings since the Society's inception. The Society was immediately popular, and as a result of its popularity the importance of separate Protestant and Roman Catholic organizations in municipal politics was markedly reduced.

The Society's chief fundraising event benefits the Lawson Health Research Institute, but it also helps many other institutions and individuals.

See also
 The Benevolent Irish Society

External links
Irish Benevolent Society website

Irish-Canadian culture in Ontario
Organizations based in London, Ontario